Torrentius may refer to:

 Johannes van der Beeck (1589 – 1644), a Dutch painter also known by his alias Johannes Torrentius.
 Laevinus Torrentius born Lieven van der Beke (1525–1595), a Flemish humanist, Neo-Latin poet and second bishop of Antwerp.

Human name disambiguation pages